Скажи, не молчи is a song by Russian girl group Serebro, taken from their debut studio album Opiumroz. The song is the group's fourth single, and was written and produced by their manager Maxim Fadeev. The song is noted as the last single recorded and released by former band member Marina Lizorkina, after her departure due to financial and personal reasons on 18 June 2009. The song is Serebro's third number one on the Russian chart.

Background
"Skazhi, ne molchi" was released as the fourth and final single from their debut studio album Opiumroz. The song was written and produced by their manager Maxim Fadeev, who produced all of their studio album and their singles (except for "Song #1", which received additional production).

The song was later re-recorded to include the vocals of new group member Anastasia Karpova, Marina Lizorkina's replacement. The re-recorded single was not released to airplay or the album but has been included on the group's EP, Izbrannoe, as a remixed single. No commercial release was performed for the single.

In the end of 2009, Serebro received a "Zolotoy Grammofon" award for the single.

Music video
The music video starts off with Elena looking towards a light, with Olga and Marina also looking towards a light. Then it zooms to Olga sitting on a building rooftop, where the sky is
pitch black and features Olga with dark angel wings, noted as a Dark Angel. Then features the group on a rooftop singing to the song.

Throughout the video, it features a woman in her home, where it appears she is depressed. She then starts crying briefly on the group. After the group sing in the second verse, it features the woman standing up from her couch and she stands with her hands wide, a similar pose to the Crucifixion of Jesus. Then after the group finish singing the last verse of the song, it features the woman sitting on the rooftop building, staring into the city, with her new angel wings, who is noted now as a guardian angel.

Chart positions

Weekly charts

Year-end charts

References

External links
Serebro website
Behind the scenes
Russian/Moscow Airplay Chart archives
Video on Youtube

Serebro songs
2008 singles
Songs written by Maxim Fadeev
2008 songs
Russian-language songs
Number-one singles in the Commonwealth of Independent States